Eduard Heger (born 3 May 1976) is a Slovak politician, serving as Prime Minister of Slovakia since 1 April 2021. He previously served as the Deputy Prime Minister and Minister of Finance in the cabinet of Igor Matovič. Heger was a member of the presidium of the populist movement Ordinary People and Independent Personalities (OĽaNO) until March 2023.

Early life
Heger was born in 1976 in Bratislava to parents employed in culture. His father, a member of the Communist party, organized big music festivals, which allowed young Heger to meet many local high profile musicians. His family was not religious, but Heger embraced Catholic charismatic renewal as a young adult after the death of his father. Prior to his entry to politics, he was professionally involved in management of the Charismatic Christian communities in Slovakia. In particular, he was active in the community under the administration of the Cathedral of St. Martin in Bratislava.

In 1999, Heger graduated in Trade and Management at the University of Economics in Bratislava. In his early career, he held junior managerial positions at several small companies, including several restaurants and bathroom accessory producer Intercomp. Between 2001 - 2005, Heger worked as a junior consultant for Cubic Corporation on a military modernization project for the Slovak Ministry of Defence.  In his early career, he spent about 18 months in the US, where he became acquainted with Juraj Droba, who later went on to become the Governor of the Bratislava Region a prominent liberal politician in Slovakia. Heger, despite being a conservative, formed a strong friendship with Droba. Together with American investors, they established a company called Old Nassau, the producer of Double Cross Vodka, a premium Slovak vodka brand destined mainly for export to the US. At Old Nassau, Heger was responsible for production and marketing until his entry to politics.

In 2016, Heger was persuaded to run for an MP seat by prominent figures of the Slovak Charismatic movement Branislav Škripek and Richard Vašečka, who were themselves active in politics.

Political career

Opposition MP, 2016–2020
In the 2016 parliamentary election, Heger gained a seat in the National Council of the Slovak Republic for the anti-corruption movement Ordinary People and Independent Personalities (OĽaNO). Although his 24th place on electoral list of his party would otherwise not suffice for a seat, he became an MP due to over 15,000 personal votes he received under the Slovakia's optional preferential voting system. As an MP, he got appointed the chairman of the OĽaNO parliamentary group, the chairman of the National Council Committee for Control of Military Intelligence and a member of the Economic and Foreign Affairs committees.

Heger was a very active and vigorous critic of Fico's Third Cabinet in Parliament. During his term, he was evaluated as the 2nd most active member of the National Council. He presented 173 bills and spoke 680 times in Parliament. He was the opposition shadow Minister of Finance and drew up "Program for sound public finances" of his movement and presented a set of measures to fight bureaucracy. He also participated in and organised several anti-corruption and anti-government protests. During the election term, he was a co-organiser of the Zastavme Hazard (Stop Gambling) initiative, which fought to ban gambling.

In the 2020 parliamentary election, Heger ran from the 142nd place on the OĽaNO list in line with the tradition of the populist movement, where popular politicians run from the bottom positions on the list that do not guarantee them an automatic MP seat. He was once again elected by preferential votes, having received nearly 63,000 personal votes.

In government

Minister of Finance, 2020–2021

After the 2020 OĽaNO electoral victory, Heger forfeit his parliamentary seat to join the government, which is not compatible with the position of an MP in the Slovak constitutional system. In the cabinet of Prime Minister Igor Matovič he served as Minister of Finance and deputy PM. During his short tenure he had to deal with a major fiscal shock of the global COVID-19 pandemic. The most important tasks with respect to the pandemic were ensuring Slovakia's ability to finance its spending needs and overseeing preparation of the national Recovery and Resilience Plan to access the Next Generation EU funding from the European Union. On 1 April 2021 a government reshuffle in response to the demands of OĽaNO's junior coalition partners Freedom and Solidarity and For the People parties who refused to support a government with Igor Matovič as a PM any longer took place. As a result, Heger became the Prime Minister and the previous PM Matovič took over the Ministry of Finance.

Prime Minister, 2021–

As a PM, Heger has won praise from his coalition partners for his diplomatic skills, which facilitated more constructive functioning of the government in comparison to the combative style to his predecessor Matovič. At the same time, critics stress the lack of autonomy of Heger in relation to Matovič, who remained the chairman of OĽaNO. On the international stage, Heger has gained notability for his strong support for Ukraine in the 2022 Russian invasion of Ukraine, which manifested in several rounds of Slovak arms deliveries for Ukraine, support for Ukrainian membership in the European Union and a personal visit of Kyiv and surrounding areas devastated by the Russian army in April 2022 along with the European Commission President Ursula von der Leyen and EU's chief diplomat Josep Borrell. His government was ousted in a motion of no confidence on 15 December, while president Čaputová dismissed it on 16 December, and now serves as acting prime minister.

On 7 March 2023 Heger announced his departure from OĽaNO. He joined political party Democrats (previous Together – Civic Democracy). His former political colleague, Christian democrat of KÚ and an evangeliser Branislav Škripek commented that Heger's departure from conservative politics was regrettable.

Political views

2022 Russian invasion of Ukraine
Heger is a staunch supporter of Ukraine in its defense against the Russian invasion. Slovakia provided major arms deliveries, including its sole S-300 missile system to Ukraine and Heger personally lobbied EU leaders for Ukrainian membership in the EU.  At the  World Economic Forum in Davos, Heger explained that his support for Ukraine is due to his belief that if Ukraine was allowed to fall, Slovakia would be next in line to be invaded by Russia.  In February 2023, Heger expressed that he would be willing to send Slovak professional combat troops to fight in Ukraine as part of Slovakia's alliance committments.

Taxes
As a Minister of Finance, Heger supported a shift of tax burden from direct to property taxation. His plans were met with a strong backlash on social media, where claims that a massive hike of real estate tax was imminent mushroomed. Heger called these claims a "hoax" and stated his reform will not increase the overall tax burden but rather provide incentives for families and businesses to work and invest by decreasing the income tax. The reform was never implemented, likely due to short-lasting tenure of Heger as the Minister of Finance.

Human Rights
Heger is a believer in the importance of European values such as human rights and the right to the freedom of expression. He also supported the protection of minorities. However he noted that Slovakia will be taking a neutral stance in the controversial Hungarian LGBT bill. Slovakia under his premiership did not sign a joint letter on fighting discrimination against the LGBT community, which 17 other EU leaders had signed.

Abortion
Heger is staunchly pro-life stating that the human life begins at conception. Nonetheless, he rejects the "polarizing" debate around abortion in Slovakia.

Personal life
Heger and his wife Lucia have four children. He is a devout Charismatic Catholic and in his free time he worked in several functions in the Catholic Church of Slovakia.

Awards and honors
 Order of Merit, 1st class (Ukraine, 23 August 2021)

Notes

References 

|-

Living people
People from Bratislava
1976 births
Slovak Roman Catholics
Finance ministers of Slovakia
Members of the National Council (Slovakia) 2016-2020
OĽaNO politicians
Prime Ministers of Slovakia
Converts to Christianity from atheism or agnosticism
University of Economics in Bratislava alumni
Recipients of the Order of Merit (Ukraine), 1st class
Slovak emigrants to the United States